Schools     = Birla Vidya Niketan

Sarala Birla (23 November, 1923 – 28 March, 2015) was an Indian Businesswoman prominent member of the Birla family of Indian industrialists. She took interest in public education and, along with her husband, is credited with having co-founded about 45 educational institutions supported by her family's conglomerate.

Biography
Sarala Birla was born into a traditional Marwadi Hindu family, the daughter of Gandhian educationist and freedom fighter Brijlal Biyani and his wife Savitri Devi Biyani. She was born in Kuchaman, Rajasthan, at the residence of her maternal grandmother. Her family hailed from Rajasthan, but her father had settled in Akola, Maharashtra, and it was in Akola that Sarla grew up. She studied in a local government school, and the medium of instruction was Marathi. She grew fluent in that language, as also in her mother tongue, the Marwadi dialect of Hindi. English was taught at the school beginning from class six, and Sarla also learned the standard register of the Hindi language at this time. Sarla grew up amid a number of spoken languages, and this made it easy for her to pick up new tongues. At a very advanced age, she made a determination to learn French, a totally new language, and she did pick up a reasonable smattering of that language.

In April 1941, she married Basant Kumar Birla, the son of GD Birla, after having been introduced to each other by Jamnalal Bajaj and Mahatma Gandhi.
Sarla Birla eventually after this marriage became the matriarch of a large family. They are sometimes referred to as the "first couple of Birla empire". They had a son, Aditya Vikram Birla. Her only son Aditya Vikram Birla died early in 1995, and later the grandmother of Kumar Mangalam Birla.

Philanthropy

She had made notable contributions through her social and institutional activities and took an active part in their working. She had been associated as governor, trustee, or otherwise by establishing the following institutions:

Birla Institute of Technology and Science, Pilani
BK Birla Institute of Engineering & Technology, Pilani
BK Birla College of Arts, Science & Commerce, Kalyan
BK Birla Public School, Kalyan
Mahadevi Birla World Academy
Mahadevi Birla Shishu Vihar
Birla Academy of Art & Culture, Calcutta
Swar Sangam, Calcutta
Sangit Kala Mandir, Calcutta
Sangit Kala Mandir Trust, Calcutta
Birla Bharati, Calcutta

Her collection of Indian art, including that on display at the Birla Academy of Art and Culture in Kolkata, ranks amongst India's notable private collections. The Sangit Kala Mandir,  besides the Birla Academy of Art and Culture, were both set up by the couple.

Life

Sarala was born the daughter of Brijlal Biyani, a freedom fighter and Congress Party worker in an unusually progressive family that even 70 years ago believed that girls must be educated. Their marriage was an arranged match made by their parents, facilitated by Jamnalal Bajaj and Mahatma Gandhi. Sarala recalled:

 "I was studying in Pune, Ferguson College, and I got a message that I have to go to Bombay, to Birla house, to see the boy. I went there, I was there for one night and there were so many boys there, I did not know who was who; I stayed there and I came back. After two-three months, I got a call from Gandhiji and my father-in-law telling me to come to Wardha. I went there from Pune and father (Ghanshyam Das Birla) asked me, 'you have seen Basant and you have not yet replied whether you are ready to marry him or not.' I said, 'No, there were eight-ten boys, so I didn't know who was who.' Then I said that I won't marry a boy unless I see him and I know who he is. Gandhiji said, 'she is perfectly right,' and then he said that we will arrange a meeting between you-you please come again. So I said, 'when I have my holidays, only then will I come.' Father was so nice, he said, 'alright.' So, when I had my holidays, I went, and we met on November 8."

Basant Kumar Birla agrees, "I told my colleagues, I am interested in a girl who was educated and as she was educated - even without seeing her, I had approved her."

Sarala was often at husband's side for 73 years. She was 91 years old, but it was a familiar sight to see her holding her husband's hand during family functions, and accompanying him to the annual general meetings of various group companies.

On 28 March 2015, she was in Delhi to attend a function marking the 121st anniversary of GD Birla. She was injured in a minor accident involving her wheelchair and the lift (elevator) and died as a result of old-age related heart failure. She was 91.

See also
 Birla Family
 Sarala Birla Academy

References

External links
    The Story Of Basant And Sarala Birla, Aaj Tak, 5 April 2015 
 The XII Science Assembly, Sarala Birla Academy, 20 June 2013

Rajasthani people
1923 births
Founders of Indian schools and colleges
Indian women philanthropists
2015 deaths
Sarla
Indian women educational theorists
People from Nagaur district
20th-century Indian women scientists
People from Kolkata
20th-century Indian educational theorists
Women scientists from West Bengal
Women educators from West Bengal
Educators from West Bengal
20th-century women educators
20th-century Indian philanthropists
20th-century women philanthropists